Folschette is a small town in the commune of Rambrouch, in western Luxembourg.  , the town has a population of 273.

Folschette was a commune in the canton of Redange until 1 January 1979, when it was merged with the communes of Arsdorf, Bigonville, and Perlé to form the new commune of Rambrouch.  The law creating Rambrouch was passed on 27 July 1978.

Footnotes

Former communes of Luxembourg
Rambrouch
Towns in Luxembourg